Marsh Lane railway station can refer to:
 Marsh Lane & Strand Road railway station, now called Bootle New Strand railway station in Bootle, Merseyside, England.
 Marsh Lane railway station, Leeds, former terminus of the Leeds and Selby Railway in Leeds, England.
 Northumberland Park railway station in London, England, formerly known as Marsh Lane

See also
 Marsh Lane (disambiguation)